The Carnobacteriaceae are a family of Gram-positive lactic acid bacteria.

References

Lactobacillales
Gram-positive bacteria